The Canton of Janzé is a canton of France, in the Ille-et-Vilaine département, located in the southeast of the department. At the French canton reorganisation which came into effect in March 2015, the canton was expanded from 6 to 10 communes.

It consists of the following communes: 
 
Amanlis 
Bourgbarré
Brie
Corps-Nuds
Janzé
Nouvoitou
Orgères
Saint-Armel
Saint-Erblon
Vern-sur-Seiche

References

Cantons of Ille-et-Vilaine